Nevade is a village in the municipality of Gornji Milanovac, Serbia. At the 2011 census, the village had a population of 627 people.

Notable people
Hadži-Prodan Gligorijević, Serbian military commander from the 18th and 19th century
Čedomir Mirković, Serbian writer and editor

References

Populated places in Moravica District